Innocence & Decadence is the fourth full-length studio album by Swedish hard rock band Graveyard. It was released on 25 September 2015.

Track listing
"Magnetic Shunk" – 3:02
"The Apple & The Tree" – 3:04
"Exit 97" – 3:50
"Never Theirs to Sell" – 2:15
"Can't Walk Out" – 5:43
"Too Much Is Not Enough" – 4:37
"From a Hole in the Wall" – 3:47
"Cause & Defect" – 3:47
"Hard-Headed" – 3:12
"Far Too Close" – 4:43
"Stay for a Song" – 4:35
"The Hatch" (bonus track) – 3:14

Charts

References

2015 albums
Graveyard (band) albums
Nuclear Blast albums